Amigos Creations  is an Indian film production company established by Sekhar Kammula in 1999. The company is based in Hyderabad. The first movie that was made under the banner was  Dollar Dreams, which won the National Award (Indira Gandhi Gold Medal) for the Best Debut Film of a Producer/Director.

Film production

Film distribution

References

Indian companies established in 1999
Mass media companies established in 1999
Film production companies based in Hyderabad, India
1999 establishments in Andhra Pradesh